James Hogg (1770–1835) was a Scottish poet and novelist.

James Hogg may also refer to:

 Sir James Hogg, 1st Baronet (1790–1876), Registrar of the Supreme Court of Judicature and Vice-Admiralty Court in Calcutta
 James Hogg (publisher) (1806–1888), Scottish publisher
 Jim Hogg (1851–1906), Governor of Texas, lawyer and statesman
 Statue of Jim Hogg, sculpture
 James Hogg (cricketer) (1906–1975), Australian cricketer
 James Wilson Hogg (1909–1997), New Zealand-born headmaster in Australia 
 James R. Hogg (born 1934), United States Navy admiral
 James C. Hogg (born 1935), Canadian physician
 James Hogg (footballer), Scottish footballer
 Jimmy Hogg, Scottish footballer

See also
 James McGarel-Hogg (disambiguation)
 James Hogge (1873–1928), British social researcher and politician